Haughton is both a surname and a given name. The name most commonly derives from its English origin, where it originated in counties Cheshire, Durham, Lancashire, Northumberland, Shropshire, Staffordshire and Nottinghamshire.

In Ireland, the name is also primarily of English origin; stemming from 16th and 17th century English settlers. However, the Gaelic surnames Ó hEachtair (Tyrone and Down) and Ó hEacháin (Tipperary) are sometimes anglicised as Haughton.

Notable people with the name include:

Surname 
 Aaliyah (Aaliyah Dana Haughton, 1979–2001), American singer and actress
 Billy Haughton (1923–1986), American harness driver
 Colin Haughton (born 1972), English badminton singles player from Denton near Manchester
 Chris Haughton (born 1992), Canadian archer
 Chris Haughton, Irish illustrator, 2011 winner of the CBI Book of the Year Awards
 David Haughton (artist) (1924–1991), British painter
 David Haughton (basketball) (born 1991), American basketball player
 Dominique Haughton, French-American statistician
 Graves Haughton (1788–1849), British orientalist
 Greg Haughton (born 1973), Jamaican track athlete
 Matilda Haughton (1890–1980), First Lady of North Carolina
 Moyra Haughton, wife of James Chichester-Clark, Prime Minister of Northern Ireland
 Percy Haughton (1876–1924), American athlete and coach
 Rosemary Haughton (born 1927), theologian
 Samuel Haughton (1821–1897), Irish geologist
 Sydney H. Haughton (1888–1982), English geologist
 William Haughton (died 1605), English playwright

Given name 
 Haughton Ackroyd (1894–1979), English footballer
 Haughton Forrest (1826–1925), Australian artist
 Haughton Lennox (1850–1927), Canadian politician